Victor Severe (born 1 November 1867 in Case-Pilote, Martinique; died 2 October 1957) was a politician from Martinique who served in the Chamber of Deputies of France from 1906 to 1914, 1924 to 1928 and 1936 to 1942.

References 

1867 births
1957 deaths
People from Case-Pilote
Martiniquais politicians
Radical Party (France) politicians
Members of the 9th Chamber of Deputies of the French Third Republic
Members of the 10th Chamber of Deputies of the French Third Republic
Members of the 13th Chamber of Deputies of the French Third Republic
Members of the 16th Chamber of Deputies of the French Third Republic